Estelle Marie Josée Nahi (born 29 May 1989), known as Josée Nahi, is an Ivorian professional footballer who plays for Gyeongju KHNP in the WK League. She was part of the Ivorian squad for the 2015 FIFA Women's World Cup.

See also
List of Ivory Coast women's international footballers

References

External links
 
 
 Profile at FIF 

1989 births
Living people
Ivorian women's footballers
Women's association football forwards
Ivory Coast women's international footballers
Place of birth missing (living people)
ŽFK Spartak Subotica players
Zvezda 2005 Perm players
WFC Rossiyanka players
Arna-Bjørnar players
Ivorian expatriate women's footballers
Expatriate women's footballers in Serbia
Expatriate women's footballers in Russia
Expatriate women's footballers in Norway
Expatriate women's footballers in South Korea
Ivorian expatriate sportspeople in Serbia
Ivorian expatriate sportspeople in Russia
Ivorian expatriate sportspeople in Norway
Ivorian expatriate sportspeople in South Korea
2015 FIFA Women's World Cup players
Toppserien players
WK League players